JM Eagle is an American corporation and a manufacturer of plastic pipe. At its 22 plants in North America, the company manufactures polyvinyl chloride (PVC) and high-density polyethylene pipe for a variety of industries including utility, plumbing, electrical, natural gas, irrigation, potable water, drainage, and sewage.

History 
In 1982, Formosa Plastics purchased the eight plants comprising the plastic-pipe operations of Johns Manville to form J-M Manufacturing, headquartered in Livingston, New Jersey. 

In November, 2005, Walter Wang acquired 100 percent of the company from Formosa Plastics. J-M Manufacturing grew to a 14-plant enterprise by 2007, when it acquired the second largest plastic-pipe manufacturer, PW Eagle. The company relocated its headquarters to Los Angeles in 2008.

Philanthropy
JM Eagle participates in various philanthropic efforts, particularly where polyvinyl chloride (PVC) piping can help facilitate the acquisition of natural resources in underprivileged communities. In 2009, Columbia University's The Earth Institute worked with the United Nations and JM Eagle to create innovative water systems for over 300,000 people in Sub-Saharan countries, including Rwanda, Kenya, and Uganda.

JM Eagle donated 45,600 feet of PVC pipe to construct an 8.5-mile pipeline to facilitate the acquisition of clean water in Santa Cruz, Honduras.

JM Eagle has provided scholarships for young African students to assist in education through college and aided in clean water delivery, including irrigation and sanitation systems, in Northern Thailand, in the villages of Santisuk and Pateung. JM Eagle supports China's efforts to provide its entire population with clean water.

References

External links

Official website
Wang family closes ranks on board seats
Potential Flint plastic water pipe supplier has some cracks in its legal history
Plastics companies of the United States
Pipe manufacture